Innukjuakju Pudlat (1913–1972), alternatively known as Inukjurakju, Innukjuakjuk, Inujurakju, Innukjuakjuk Pudlat, Inukjurakju Pudlat, Innukyuarakjuke Pudlat, or Innukjuarakjuke Pudlat, was an Inuk artist who worked primarily in drawing and printmaking. During her artistic career she worked with the West Baffin Eskimo Co-operative in Cape Dorset, Nunavut.

Artistic career 
Pudlat began drawing in the late 1950s alongside her husband Pudlo Pudlat, after an arm injury made it difficult for him to practice his then-preferred artistic medium of carving. The pair were encouraged to do so by Inuit art pioneer James Archibald Houston and Terry Ryan, who later became manager of the West Baffin Eskimo Co-Operative.

Pudlat's works were often made using stonecut printmaking methods, and sometimes seal skin stencil on paper. Her prints focus on playful renderings of animals living in the Cape Dorset area, such as owls, Canada geese, rabbits, and walruses. Her works also depict activities of daily life in Cape Dorset, including hunting, fishing, and singing.

Personal life 
Pudlat was widowed from her first marriage. In 1950, she formally married Pudlo Pudlat, a well-known and prolific Inuk graphic artist. Together, the pair had six children, of whom three daughters survived.

In 1957, Innukjuakju and Pudlo moved to Cape Dorset to access healthcare for Pudlo, who had sustained an arm injury from a hunting accident.

Pudlat's artistic career continued until she became ill in 1970. She died in Cape Dorset on March 30, 1972.

Notable collections 

 National Gallery of Canada
 Museum of Anthropology at UBC
 Morris and Helen Belkin Art Gallery
 Canadian Museum of History

References

External links 

 Innukjuakju Pudlat at Katilvik.com
 PUDLAT, Innukjuakju at Canadian Women Artists History Initiative

1913 births
1972 deaths
Canadian Inuit women
Inuit printmakers
Artists from Nunavut
People from Kinngait
20th-century Canadian artists
Women printmakers
20th-century Canadian printmakers
Inuit artists
Inuit from the Northwest Territories
20th-century Canadian women artists